KDMS (1290 AM) is a radio station licensed to El Dorado, Arkansas, United States, and serving the El Dorado area. The station is currently owned by Noalmark Broadcasting Corporation.

References

External links
KDMS 1290 Facebook

DMS
Noalmark Broadcasting Corporation radio stations
El Dorado, Arkansas
Gospel radio stations in the United States